The SWAPO Party Youth League (SPYL), formerly known as the SWAPO Youth League (SYL), is the youth wing of the SWAPO Party, the ruling party of Namibia since 1990. It shares the same principles as those of the SWAPO Party.

Foundation
SPYL came into existence in 1969 after the SWAPO Tanga Consultative Congress in Tanzania adopted a new constitution. In 1971, the International Court of Justice declared South African occupation of Namibia as illegal. At that time there existed pervasive disgruntlement in the country due to the Odendaal Plan that was going to initiate a homelands policy. The Youth league protested at major colleges and schools and participated at the general strike of 1971 and 1972, a major turning point in the Namibian fight for independence. There was also a schools' boycott in northern Namibia in 1973 against the Bantustan policy. These activities resulted in the arrest and imprisonment at Robben Island of many youth leaders, including Nashilongo Taapopi, Jerry Ekandjo and Martin Kapewasha among others.

Once the Portuguese revolution struck in May 1974, it was possible for Namibian youth to leave the country via Angola. Thousands of youth left Namibia between May and December 1974 to join SWAPO abroad, majority ended up serving in the People's Liberation Army of Namibia (PLAN). Youth activist Keshii Pelao Nathanael, was the leader of the internal radical youth inside the country. He and his youth group members orchestrated most of these strikes. He was elected as the founding president of the SWAPO Youth League at the Oniipa Congress in 1974 before going into exile.

Structure and organs
The National Organs of SPYL are established under the SPYL constitution and are chaired by the Secretary. These are the Congress, which is the highest decision making body of SPYL, the Central Committee, and the National Executive Committee. The SPYL constitution also makes provision for duties and functions of SPYL national office-bearers which are:

 The Secretary, also SPYL President
 Deputy Secretary
 Secretary for Finance and Administration
 Secretary for Information, Publicity and Mobilisation
 Secretary for International Affairs
 Secretary for Labour and Justice
 Secretary for Education, SWAPO Pioneer Movement and Culture
 Secretary for Economic Affairs
 Secretary for Health, Population and Environment
 Two additional members

Leaders
 Keshii Pelao Nathanael, 1974 – 1976
 Ignatius Shixwameni, 1987 – 1997
 Paulus Kapia, 1997 – 2007
 Elijah Ngurare, 2007 – 2015 (expelled from position)
 Veiko Nekundi, 2015 – 2017 (acting)
 Ephraim Tuhadeleni Nekongo, 2017–present

Notable members

 Job Amupanda, Former SPYL Secretary for Information
 Jerry Ekandjo, Government Minister; member of SPYL from 1963–79
 Natangwe Ithete, Deputy Minister of Finance and former Secretary of Education of SPYL 2007-2012.
 Elia Irimali , Governor of Oshana Region, Former SPYL Activist
 Ndali Che Kamati, Namibian Ambassador to Russia, former Vice President of International Union of Students and well known SPYL activist during the 1980s.
 Naftali Kambungu, Vice President of the World Federation of Democratic Youth and former Secretary of Labour and Justice of SPYL 2012-2015.
 Kazenambo Kazenambo, former Government Minister, Member of the SPYL Central Committee from 1991–2002
 Saara Kuugongelwa-Amadhila, Prime Minister of Namibia and former Secretary of Economic Affairs of SPYL 1997-2002. 
 Peya Mushelenga, Deputy Minister of International Relations and Cooperation and former Secretary of International Affairs of SPYL 2007-2012.
 Charles Ndaxu Namoloh, Minister of Safety and Security, he fled to Zambia with SPYL in 1974
 Sackeus Shanghala, former Minister of Justice and former Secretary of Labour and Justice of SPYL 2007-2012.
 Pohamba Shifeta, Minister of Environment and Tourism and former Central Committee of SPYL 1997-2002.
 Piet van der Walt, Government Minister, businessperson

See also
 Democratic Co-operative Party

References

SWAPO
National liberation movements
Youth wings of political parties in Namibia
Anti-Apartheid organisations
Youth wings of social democratic parties
Youth organizations established in 1969
World Federation of Democratic Youth